City–County Airport may refer to:

Two airports formerly known as City–County Airport:
 Gatesville Municipal Airport (FAA: GOP) in Gatesville, Texas, United States
 Madras Municipal Airport (FAA: S33) in Madras, Oregon, United States

Other similarly named airports:
 Atwood–Rawlins County City–County Airport (FAA: ADT) in Atwood, Kansas, United States
 Comanche County–City Airport (FAA: MKN) in Comanche, Texas, United States
 Deer Lodge-City-County Airport (FAA: 38S) in Deer Lodge, Montana, United States
 Havre City–County Airport (FAA: HVR) in Havre, Montana, United States
 Henderson City-County Airport (FAA: EHR) in Henderson, Kentucky, United States
 Minneapolis City County Airport (FAA: 45K) in Minneapolis, Kansas, United States
 Modesto City–County Airport (FAA: MOD) in Modesto, California, United States
 Newton City/County Airport (FAA: EWK) in Newton, Kansas, United States